The 2020 Women's National League was the 10th season of the Women's National League, the highest women's association football league in the Republic of Ireland.

The League lacked a title sponsor, as the Só Hotel Group did not renew their agreement from the previous season. Barretstown were announced as a "charity partner" on 24 July 2020. Expansion teams Athlone Town and Bohemians competed for the first time.

Following the financial collapse of Limerick F.C., they were replaced by a new team, Treaty United. Kilkenny United were excluded for a variety of reasons, including that they had not bonded with the local league, they had changed venues for home games, did not train in Kilkenny, lacked a qualified manager, and had produced poor results (just seven points in the last three seasons combined [60 matches]).

Originally scheduled to kick off on 15 March, the season's opening was delayed, initially to late June by the COVID-19 pandemic. A reduced season eventually kicked-off in August 2020. The WNL Cup was deferred for the season, but the 2020 FAI Women's Cup was effectively a League Cup, with the nine Women's National League clubs the only participants.

On 21 November 2020, Peamount United won their second consecutive title and third overall after a 3–1 win over Shelbourne.

Teams

Personnel and kits

Note: Flags indicate national team as has been defined under FIFA eligibility rules. Players may hold more than one non-FIFA nationality.

Format
In the initial phase of the season, the nine teams played a round-robin tournament whereby each team played each one of the other teams once. After eight games, the league split into two sections of five and four teams, with each team playing every other team in their section once.

League table

Standings

Positions by round

The table lists the positions of teams after each week of matches. In order to preserve chronological evolvements, any postponed matches are not included to the round at which they were originally scheduled, but added to the full round they were played immediately afterwards.

Results

Matches 1–8
Teams play each other once.

Matches 9–11/12
After eight matches, the league split into two sections i.e. the top five and the bottom four, with the teams playing every other team in their section once (either at home or away). The exact matches were determined by the position of the teams in the league table at the time of the split.

Group one

Group two

Statistics

Top scorers

Awards

Monthly awards

Annual awards

Broadcasting
The title-deciding match between Peamount United and Shelbourne on 21 November 2020 was streamed live by the Football Association of Ireland on their FAI TV YouTube channel. The annual awards ceremony was televised live on Eir Sport 1.

See also
 2020 FAI Women's Cup

References

External links 
 

Women's National League (Ireland) seasons
Ireland
Ireland
Women
1
1
Women's National League Ireland, 2020